The Ugandan musk shrew (Crocidura mutesae) is a species of mammal in the family Soricidae. It is found in Uganda, the Democratic Republic of Congo and the Central African Republic. Its range, population size and habits are poorly known.

Description
The pelage is long, both dorsal and ventral fur being greyish, while the legs are darker grey. The hind feet are both long and broad. This species resembles the African giant shrew (Crocidura olivieri), but is slightly smaller, with a smaller, less robust skull.

Distribution and habitat
The Ugandan musk shrew has a disjoint distribution, having been found in Uganda, where the type locality is Kampala, in Tandala in the Democratic Republic of the Congo, and in the Dzanga-Sangha Special Reserve and Batouri in the Central African Republic. It is present in both primary and secondary forest, as well as in single species Gilbertiodendron dewevrei forest. This shrew seems to favour fairly open areas with little undergrowth.

Status
This shrew is poorly known and its precise range, natural history and the threats it faces are unknown. In a mixed forest in Salo, in the Central African Republic, it formed about one third of all shrews caught in pitfall traps, and in the Dzanga-Sangha Special Reserve, it was identified in 2.3% of scats left by small carnivores. Because it has insufficient evidence of its abundance and population size, the International Union for Conservation of Nature has assessed its conservation status as being "data deficient".

References

Crocidura
Mammals of the Central African Republic
Mammals of the Democratic Republic of the Congo
Mammals of Uganda
Mammals described in 1910
Taxonomy articles created by Polbot
Taxa named by Edmund Heller